Paul Brennan may refer to:

Musicians
 Paul Brennan (Canadian musician), drummer
 Paul Brennan (Northern Ireland musician), traditional musician from County Down
 Pól Brennan (born 1956), Irish singer, songwriter and producer

Others
 Paul Brennan (academic) (1939–2003), Irish academic
 Paul Brennan (Fair City), a fictional character in the Irish soap opera
 Paul Brennan (Gaelic footballer) (born  1988/9), Irish footballer playing for Donegal and Réalt na Mara
 Virgil Brennan (1920–1943), also known as Paul Brennan, Australian aviator and flying ace